James Thomas Kruger (20 December 1917 – 9 May 1987) was a South African-born politician who was part of the conservative National Party government which championed apartheid. He rose to the position of Minister of Justice and the Police in the cabinet of Prime Minister John Vorster from 1974 to 1979. He was also President of the Senate from 1979 until 1980, when it was abolished.

Background
Kruger was born in Bethlehem, Orange Free State, South Africa of Welsh parents and was adopted by Afrikaner parents. He obtained his matric from a high school in Ventersdorp and then became a miner. He trained as a surveyor at a gold mine in Brakpan before taking an exam as a mining surveyor. Later he would work as surveyor engineer in Barberton.

Education
Kruger studied part-time for an Afrikaans teaching degree from the University of South Africa (UNISA) and later attended the University of the Witwatersrand where he obtained a law degree in 1954. He began practising as a lawyer in 1955.

Political career
In 1962 he became a member of the Transvaal Provincial Council. As National Party candidate, he became a member of the House of Assembly in the South African parliament from 1966. In 1972, Kruger was made a deputy cabinet minister in the police, health and welfare portfolio. In 1974 he was upgraded to a full minister for the police, prisons and justice portfolio. In June 1979, the ceremonial post of President of the Senate but retired in 1980 when the Senate was abolished.

Steve Biko
He was responsible for the banning of Black Consciousness Movement leader Steve Biko; when Biko died in police custody, the police claimed that Biko had died during a hunger strike. This account was challenged by the white South African journalist Donald Woods, a personal friend of Biko. Kruger's response to Biko's death was: "Dit laat my koud." ("It leaves me cold."). Kruger later began to recant his earlier statements, while claiming that Biko had authored pamphlets calling for "blood and body in the streets." Woods came under increasing scrutiny for his articles, and finally, following the publication of an article calling on Kruger to resign, he was banned under direct orders from Kruger. Not long afterwards, Woods and his family fled the country for a life of exile in England.

In response to international pressure, the South African government ordered an inquest to investigate the cause of Biko's death; the presiding magistrate concluded that Biko had died of brain damage caused by head injury; however, no one was held responsible for, or prosecuted for, Biko's death. Even so, it was the end of Kruger's career. Having decided that his performance had severely compromised the country's credibility abroad, the government ordered him to resign, and he lost not only his cabinet post, but his membership in the ruling party, as well. In 1982, Kruger joined the Conservative Party of Andries Treurnicht in protest against the racial reforms of the Botha Government. Kruger spent the rest of his life in political obscurity.

Marriage
Kruger was married to Susan Kruger after whom the Robben Island ferry the Susan Kruger was named in 1977.

Death
Kruger died at his home in Irene after recently having heart surgery. He was survived by his wife, Susanna and two sons, Eugene and Eitel.

Cultural references
In the film Cry Freedom (1987), which was based on Woods's role in the anti-apartheid struggle, Kruger was portrayed by English actor John Thaw.

In the film Goodbye Bafana (2007), Kruger was portrayed by Norman Anstey.

See also
South Africa under apartheid

Notes 

1917 births
1987 deaths
Afrikaner people
Apartheid government
Law enforcement in South Africa
South African anti-communists
Justice ministers of South Africa
Welsh emigrants to South Africa
National Party (South Africa) politicians
Presidents of the Senate of South Africa
Steve Biko affair